The Yangtze Agreement was an agreement between Great Britain and Germany signed on October 6, 1900, signed by Prime Minister Lord Salisbury and Ambassador Paul von Hatzfeldt respectively. It stated both parties' opposition to the partition of China into spheres of influence.

The agreement was signed in accordance with the Open Door Policy, which all major nations supported. The policy involved equal access to Chinese markets. The Germans supported it because a partition of China would limit Germany to a small trading market, instead of all of China.

References 

1900 treaties
Foreign relations of the Qing dynasty